This is a list of the districts of England, a type of country subdivision governed by a local authority, that cover all of England. Most English districts are known as non-metropolitan districts and are found in non-metropolitan counties. However, primarily in urban areas, other types of districts are found. Each district is contained within one ceremonial county, except Stockton-on-Tees, which is split for this purpose.

Nomenclature
There are currently  districts in England. The districts are divided into several categories which determine the powers and functions of the local authority.

32 London boroughs
36 metropolitan districts
181 non-metropolitan districts (in a two-tier county arrangement)
58 unitary authorities (all also non-metropolitan districts, but with the combined powers of non-metropolitan counties and districts)
City of London (sui generis)
Isles of Scilly (sui generis)

Each district can additionally hold the honorific statuses of borough, city and royal borough, which does not affect the powers and functions of the local authority.

List of districts

Former districts
The current pattern of districts was introduced in 1974 throughout England and Wales, replacing an older system of municipal boroughs, urban districts, rural districts and county boroughs.

In England, several changes have taken place, but only within the framework created then.

Former English districts are as follows

In most cases, these districts were merged to form unitary authorities, which are indicated in the right.

The exceptions were Malvern Hills and Leominster, which were both split between the new district of Herefordshire and a new district of Malvern Hills.

See List of rural and urban districts of England for a list of the districts as they stood immediately before 1 April 1974.

Renamings
Under section 74 of the Local Government Act 1972, the council of a district, county or London borough (or county borough in Wales) may change its name, providing the resolution to do so gains two-thirds of the votes at a special meeting. Until 1 April 1978, the council had to have the permission of the Secretary of State, but since that date they may do so unilaterally. At least one district name change was vetoed: the shadow authority for North Wolds wished to become "Bridlington and Yorkshire Wolds" before 1974 at the same time as other name changes were allowed.

Several English districts have done this, whilst others have been renamed under the 1990s UK local government reform. A few districts have even changed names twice.

† The resolutions to change the name of the district were made by the "shadow" councils elected on 7 June 1973.

Additionally, one English county has been renamed.  Shropshire was originally formally known as 'Salop'.  Its name was changed effective 1 April 1980.

See also
List of rural and urban districts in England in 1973

References

External links
The English Non-metropolitan Districts (Definition) Order 1972 (SI 1972/2039)

02
Districts of England
English districts
Districts, English02
fr:Liste des districts d'Angleterre
no:Distrikt (England)